Victoria is a ward in the London Borough of Hackney and forms part of the Hackney South and Shoreditch constituency in the United Kingdom.

The ward returns three councillors to Borough Council, with an election every four years. At the previous election on 6 May 2010, Katie Hanson, Daniel Kemp, and Geoff Taylor, all Labour Party candidates, were returned.

Victoria ward has a total population of 12,065, the most populated ward in the borough. This compares with the average ward population within the borough of 10,674. Turnout was 57%; with 5,362 votes cast. The population at the 2011 Census was 13,231

References

External links
 London Borough of Hackney list of constituencies and councillors.
 Labour Party profile of Katie Hanson
 Labour Party profile of Daniel Kemp
 Labour Party profile of Geoff Taylor

Wards of the London Borough of Hackney
1965 establishments in England